Fouriesburg is a small town situated at the junction of the R711 and R26 routes in the eastern Free State, South Africa. It is near the Maluti Mountains and only 10 km from Caledon's Poort border post, which gives access to Lesotho.

History
During the late nineteenth century, this land was donated to the Orange Free State by a local farmer of Huguenot descent, Christoffel Fourie, for use as a temporary capital during the Second Boer War. It was the site of several engagements during the Boer War, and by 1902 the original settlement had been almost completely destroyed.

Vicinity

A small private resort, Meiringskloof Nature Park, is located in a valley just northeast of town. Fouriesburg is about half an hour's drive from Clarens, a popular tourist destination, and a 45-minute drive from Golden Gate Highlands National Park. It is about fifty kilometres south-east of Bethlehem, and some fifty-three from Ficksburg.

Fouriesburg ranked first during South Africa's 2013 Kwela Town of the Year competition.

References

Populated places in the Dihlabeng Local Municipality
Populated places founded by Afrikaners
Populated places established in 1892